Schoenus is a predominately austral genus of sedges, commonly known as bogrushes, or veldrushes in South Africa. Species of this genus occur mainly in South Africa (some 44 species), Australia (some 70 species) and Southeast Asia. Others are found in scattered locations worldwide, from Europe (2 species) to Asia, North Africa (1 species) and the Americas. Three species occur in the peatlands of southern South America, including S. antarcticus which is found in Tierra del Fuego, where it forms a component of hyperhumid Magellanic moorland.

Taxonomic attention to the South African taxa, starting 2017, revealed a wealth of species. 24 species were transferred from Tetraria and Epischoenus into Schoenus, and several new species were described. S. inconspicuus, discovered on the outskirts of Cape Town, consists of only a few specimens.

Etymology
The Greek word schoinos means 'rush', 'reed' or 'coord'. Schoenus has also been used to represent ancient Egyptian, Greek and Roman units of length and area based on knotted cords. In addition, it was the name of several ancient Greek towns, which were located in Arcadia, Boeotia and Corinthia, as well as several individuals in Greek mythology.

Description
Similar to other sedges (plants in family Cyperaceae), Schoenus are graminoid (grass-like) monocotyledonous flowering plants. Most species of Schoenus usually grow in clumps, but a few species are more spreading in growth form. The flowering stems (culms) of Schoenus are usually round (terete), but there are some species with angular (e.g. Schoenus quadrangularis) or flat (e.g. Schoenus complanatus) culms. Leaves of Schoenus are serrate, basal and usually well-developed, but there are some species with leaves reduced to a sheath (e.g. Schoenus gracillimus). Several species are hairy (e.g. Schoenus neovillosus), but in this genus it is not common to have hairs.

Schoenus species 

, the Plants of the World Online indicates there are 157 species of Schoenus; however, this does not take into account several taxonomic changes made since 2020 (see sections below). 

Bogrushes

Several of the species that are currently on the list provided by Plants of the World Online database as of November 2022 have recently been transferred to other genera based on molecular and morphological evidence:

Ammothryon grandiflorum (Nees ex Lehm.) R.L.Barrett, K.L.Wilson & J.J.Bruhl = synonym of Schoenus grandiflorus (Nees ex Lehm.) F.Muell.
Chaetospora curvifolia  R.Br. = synonym of Schoenus curvifolius (R.Br.) Roem. & Schult.
Chaetospora subbulbosa (Benth.) K.L.Wilson & R.L.Barrett = synonym of Schoenus subbulbosus Benth.
Chaetospora turbinata R.Br. = synonym of Schoenus turbinatus (R.Br.) Roem. & Schult.

Southern African Schoenus

The genus Schoenus includes 44 species from the southern Africa Schoenus clade, which are divided into three main groups.

Veldrushes

Schoenus cuspidatus group

Epischoenus group

Schoenus compar - Schoenus pictus group

Unplaced species

Synonyms (yet to be incorporated in Plants of the World Online database)
Schoenus adnatus (Levyns) T.L.Elliott & Muasya = synonym of Schoenus tenuellus T.L.Elliott & Muasya

References

 
Cyperaceae genera
Taxa named by Carl Linnaeus